Kampoi is a village in the municipal unit of Keramia on the island of Crete, Greece.  It is built on a small plateau on the northern slope of Keramos, a peak of the White mountains (Lefka Ori).
It is located 26.4 km south of Chania at 500m. It has 57 inhabitants (2011).  

There are two more small villages which together with Kampoi form a community, which is part of the municipal unit of Keramia:
Madaro (15 inhabitants)
Tsakistra (20)

During the revolutions of the 19th century, it was the center for the Cretan revolutionaries.  A famous revolutionary (hainis) of this period, Ioannis Moutsakis was born here. 

From Kampoi you may start for the Psychro Pigadi refuge at an altitude of 1450m. Until recently, the only access was by foot. This is a location with a view of virtually the whole north part of the prefecture. It's possible to get there by car, but the road is made of dirt and is on a very steep incline, making it quite unsafe.

References

Populated places in Chania (regional unit)